Chlorobis(ethylene)rhodium dimer is an organorhodium compound with the formula Rh2Cl2(C2H4)4.  It is a red-orange solid that is soluble in nonpolar organic solvents. The molecule consists of two bridging chloride ligands and four ethylene ligands.  The ethylene ligands are labile and readily displaced even by other alkenes.  A variety of homogeneous catalysts have been prepared from this complex.

Preparation and reactions
The complex is prepared by treating an aqueous methanolic solution of hydrated rhodium trichloride with ethylene at room temperature.  Rh(III) is reduced with oxidation of ethylene to acetaldehyde:
2 RhCl3(H2O)3  +  6 C2H4   →   Rh2Cl2(C2H4)4  +  2 CH3CHO  +  4 HCl  +  4 H2O
Reflecting the lability of its ligands, the complex does not tolerate recrystallization.

The complex reacts slowly with water to give acetaldehyde.  With HCl, it gives RhCl2(C2H2)2−.  Rh2Cl2(C2H4)4 catalyzes the dimerization of ethylene to 1-butene.

Carbonylation affords rhodium carbonyl chloride.  Treatment with acetylacetone and aqueous KOH gives Rh(acac)(C2H4)2.

References

Organorhodium compounds
Homogeneous catalysis
Alkene complexes
Dimers (chemistry)
Chloro complexes
Rhodium(I) compounds